Croydon is a census-designated place located in Bristol Township, Bucks County, Pennsylvania, United States. As of the 2010 census, the CDP had a total population of 9,950.

History
The name Croydon comes from the town of Croydon in South-East England; nine miles south of the historic center of London, it was traditionally part of Surrey but is now the center of the London Borough of Croydon.

The White Hall of Bristol College was listed on the National Register of Historic Places in 1984.

Law and government 
Croydon does not have a central government of its own. It is not organized or incorporated as a town or village. The area known as Croydon is located in Bristol Township. Croydon has an all-volunteer fire company which handles fire, medical, marine, and other calls servicing the community named Croydon Fire Company #1. Croydon uses zip code 19021.

Economy 
Several notable mid-size businesses are headquartered in Croydon, including PAC Industries, Denaq Laptop Batteries, 360 Digital Studios, Blask of Croydon, Johnston's Sporting Goods and Neshaminy Creek Brewing Company

Geography 
Croydon is located at 40°5'36" North, 74°53'57" West (40.093443, -74.899128).

There are several private marinas on the Neshaminy, and a Commonwealth of Pennsylvania marina (part of Neshaminy State Park) at the mouth of the creek. The Neshaminy empties into the Delaware River, which borders Croydon to the east, and forms the boundary between Pennsylvania and New Jersey. The Delaware is tidal in Croydon, and is navigable by ocean-going vessels (40 foot marked / maintained channel) as far upriver as Trenton, New Jersey.

Croydon has a humid subtropical climate and average monthly temperatures range from 32.8° F in January to 76.6° F in July.  The local hardiness zone is 7a.

Demographics 

As of the 2010 census, Croydon was 82.9% White, 4.8% Black or African American, 0.2% Native American, 2.9% Asian, 0.1% some other race, and 1.6% were two or more races. 7.4% of the population was of Hispanic or Latino ancestry.

As of the census of 2000, there were 9,993 people, 3,735 households, and 2,577 families living in the CDP. The population density was 4,029.9 people per square mile (1,555.8/km). There were 3,875 housing units at an average density of 1,562.7/sq mi (603.3/km). The racial makeup of the CDP was 93.30% White, 2.89% African American, 0.31% Native American, 1.28% Asian, 0.01% Pacific Islander, 1.18% from other races, and 1.03% from two or more races. 3.68% of the population were Hispanic or Latino of any race.

There were 3,735 households, out of which 31.7% had children under the age of 18 living with them, 51.4% were married couples living together, 11.3% had a female householder with no husband present, and 31.0% were non-families. 25.3% of all households were made up of individuals, and 8.0% had someone living alone who was 65 years of age or older. The average household size was 2.67 and the average family size was 3.24.

In the CDP, the population was spread out, with 24.6% under the age of 18, 9.5% from 18 to 24, 33.0% from 25 to 44, 22.0% from 45 to 64, and 10.9% who were 65 years of age or older. The median age was 36 years. For every 100 females, there were 103.5 males. For every 100 females age 18 and over, there were 100.9 males.

The median income for a household in the CDP was $46,858, and the median income for a family was $55,660. Males had a median income of $37,574 versus $27,069 for females. The per capita income for the CDP was $19,751. 5.7% of the population and 3.9% of families were below the poverty line. Out of the total population, 8.9% of those under the age of 18 and 1.7% of those 65 and older were living below the poverty line.

Education
The Roman Catholic Archdiocese of Philadelphia announced in 2011 that St. Thomas Aquinas School was closing as the number of students had declined.

References

Census-designated places in Bucks County, Pennsylvania
Census-designated places in Pennsylvania
Pennsylvania populated places on the Delaware River